Robin Wilson may refer to:
R. N. D. Wilson (1899–1953), Irish poet
Robin Wilson (author) (1928–2013), science fiction author
Robin Wilson (mathematician) (born 1943), head of pure mathematics at the Open University, UK
Robin Wilson (field hockey) (born 1957), New Zealand field hockey player
Robin Wilson (musician) (born 1965), American singer and guitarist, lead vocalist of the Gin Blossoms
Robin Wilson (eco-designer) (born 1969), eco-friendly lifestyle expert
Robin Wilson (curler), Canadian curler
Robin Wilson (psychologist), Canadian-American psychologist
Robin Lee Wilson (1933–2019), British civil engineer